Mercedes Álvarez (born 18 December 1956) is a retired Cuban sprinter who specialized in the 400 metres.

She won the gold medal at the 1974 Central American and Caribbean Junior Championships, the silver medal at the 1981 Central American and Caribbean Championships, the silver medal at the 1982 Central American and Caribbean Games the silver medal at the 1983 Central American and Caribbean Championships, finished sixth at the 1983 Pan American Games. sixth at the 1986 Ibero-American Championships and seventh at the 1988 Ibero-American Championships. She also became Cuban champion.

In the 4 × 400 metres relay she won a gold medal at the 1982 Central American and Caribbean Games, a bronze medal at the 1983 Pan American Games a gold medal at the 1986 Ibero-American Championships, finished fourth at the 1987 Pan American Games and won a bronze medal at the 1988 Ibero-American Championships.

References

1956 births
Living people
Cuban female sprinters
Central American and Caribbean Games silver medalists for Cuba
Central American and Caribbean Games gold medalists for Cuba
Pan American Games bronze medalists for Cuba
Athletes (track and field) at the 1975 Pan American Games
Athletes (track and field) at the 1983 Pan American Games
Athletes (track and field) at the 1987 Pan American Games
Pan American Games medalists in athletics (track and field)
Central American and Caribbean Games medalists in athletics
Competitors at the 1982 Central American and Caribbean Games
Medalists at the 1983 Pan American Games
20th-century Cuban women
20th-century Cuban people
21st-century Cuban women